Seehausen (Uckermark) is a railway station in the village of Seehausen, municipality Oberuckersee, Brandenburg, Germany. The station lies of the Angermünde–Stralsund railway and the train services are operated by Deutsche Bahn.

Train services
The station is served by the following service(s):

Regional services  Stralsund - Greifswald - Pasewalk - Angermünde - Berlin - Ludwigsfelde - Jüterbog - Falkenberg - Elsterwerda

References

Deutsche Bahn website

Railway stations in Brandenburg
Buildings and structures in Uckermark (district)
Railway stations in Germany opened in 1863